Mackenzie James Horton  (born 25 April 1996) is an Australian freestyle swimmer. He is an Olympic gold medallist, World Championships medallist, and Commonwealth Games medallist. At the 2016 Olympic Games in Rio de Janeiro, Brazil, he finished first in the 400m freestyle, winning his first gold medal and became the first male swimmer from the state of Victoria to do so in the Games' history.

Career

2012–2013
Horton first represented Australia at the 2012 Junior Pan Pacific Swimming Championships in Honolulu at the Veterans Memorial Aquatic Center, where he won gold in the 1500 metre freestyle in a championship record time of 15:10.07. At the same meet, he finished second in the 400-metre freestyle and 4th in the 800-metre freestyle. He also placed fourth in the 4×200-metre freestyle relay with a final time of 7:27.90, tenth in the preliminaries of the 200-metre freestyle with a 1:51.83, and twenty-first in the 100-metre freestyle with a 51.79.

Two months later at the final leg of the 2012 World Cup in Singapore, Horton won the 1500 metre freestyle event in 14:54.25.

At the 2013 Australian Youth Olympic Festival, Horton won gold in the 1500 metre freestyle event.

Eight months later at the 2013 World Junior Championships in Dubai, Horton won five gold medals and a silver. He took out the 200 m, 400 m, 800 m and 1500 m freestyle events and alongside Luke Percy, Regan Leong and Blake Jones won the 4 × 100 m freestyle relay all in new Championships record times. The team of Horton, Leong, Isaac Jones and Jack McLoughlin finished second behind the British in the 4 × 200 m freestyle relay event.

2014–2016
Horton qualified for his first senior team at the 2014 Australian Swimming Championships where he won the 1500 metre freestyle in 14:51.55 and finished second behind David McKeon in the 400-metre freestyle in 3:44.60, setting two new junior world records. Horton also finished 5th in the 200-metre freestyle in 1:47.36 which also set a new junior world record.

At the 2014 Commonwealth Games in Glasgow, Horton won the silver medal in the 1500 metre freestyle in new junior world record time of 14:48.76 and narrowly missed the podium in the 400-metre freestyle finishing in fourth place in 3:44.91. In the 4 × 200-metre freestyle relay event, Horton alongside Thomas Fraser-Holmes, David McKeon and Ned McKendry finished as the fastest qualifies with Horton swimming the anchor leg in 1:49.17. In the final, Horton was replaced by Cameron McEvoy and they went on to win the gold in a new games record time of 7:07.38.

Three weeks later at the 2014 Pan Pacific Swimming Championships in Gold Coast, Australia, Horton won the silver medal in the 800-metre freestyle in 7.47.73, the bronze medal in the 1500 metre freestyle in 14:52.78 and with McKeon, McEvoy and Fraser-Holmes won bronze in the 4 × 200-metre freestyle relay in 7:08.55.

In April 2014, Horton became an ambassador for Horton's Heroes Water Polo team (SHWP) with the swimwear brand Speedo and in August 2014, after his breakthrough performances he was named the winner of the Georgina Hope Foundation Rising Star of the Australian Swim Team.

For his first long course World Championships, the 2015 World Aquatics Championships held in August with swimming competition at Ak Bars Arena in Kazan, Russia, Horton won his first world medal in the 800 metre freestyle, finishing third with a time of 7:44.02 that was less than five seconds behind gold medalist Sun Yang of China and silver medalist Gregorio Paltrinieri of Italy to win the bronze medal.

At the 2016 Summer Olympics, Horton represented Australia in the 400 m freestyle, in which he won gold, and the 4 × 200 metre freestyle relay, in which he finished 4th with his teammates. He finished 5th in the final of the 1500 m freestyle.

2019–2021
At the 2019 World Aquatics Championships, Horton won silver in the 400 m freestyle event where he came runner up to Sun Yang. In a controversial "stand-off" Horton refused to shake the hand of Sun or to stand on the winners' podium. Horton had previously called Sun a "drug cheat". On 28 February 2020, Sun was issued an 8 year ban by the Court of Arbitration for Sport (CAS) for tampering with the doping control process, with calls to reissue medals from affected events, though the CAS clarified that Sun would not be stripped of any of his medals because "doping tests performed on [Sun] shortly before and after the aborted doping control in September 2018 were negative" and "in the absence of any evidence that [Sun] may have engaged in doping activity ... the results achieved by [Sun] in the period prior to the CAS award being issued should not be disqualified." Horton has been criticised for remaining silent on Australian swimmers who have faced punishments for violating anti-doping rules.

At the 2021 Australian Swimming Trials, Horton came third in the qualification final for the 400m freestyle, failing to qualify behind Elijah Winnington and Jack McLoughlin. Horton would also make it to the final for the 200m freestyle and would come sixth, earning him selection for the 2020 Olympics in the squad for the Men's 4 × 200 m freestyle relay.

2022
The following year, Horton won the silver medal in the 400-metre freestyle, with a 3:44.06, and the bronze medal in the 200-metre freestyle, with a 1:46.70, at the 2022 Australian Swimming Championships, held in May in Adelaide, and qualified to represent Australia at the 2022 World Aquatics Championships and in swimming competition at the 2022 Commonwealth Games.

A little over three months later, Horton qualified for and was named to the Australia roster for the 2022 World Short Course Championships, to be held in December following the Championships relocation from the Palace of Water Sports in Kazan to his hometown of Melbourne, based on his performances in August at the 2022 Australian Short Course Swimming Championships. Day three of the 2022 World Short Course Championships, contested at Melbourne Sports and Aquatic Centre, he ranked fourth in the preliminaries of the 400 metre freestyle with a time of 3:38.09 and qualified for the evening final. Dropping to a 3:37.94 in the final, he placed sixth. The following day, he won a silver medal as part of the finals relay in the 4×200 metre freestyle relay, splitting a 1:43.19 for the fourth leg of the relay to help set new Oceanian, Commonwealth, and Australian records in the event with finals relay teammates Thomas Neill, Kyle Chalmers, and Flynn Southam in a time of 6:46.54. In the inaugural men's 800 metre freestyle at a World Short Course Championships, the following day, he placed ninth overall with a time of 7:40.64.

International championships (50 m)

 Horton swam only in the preliminaries.

International championships (25 m)

Career-best times

See also
List of Commonwealth Games medallists in swimming (men)
 List of Caulfield Grammar School people

References

External links
 
 
 
 
 
  (archive 2)

1996 births
Commonwealth Games bronze medallists for Australia
Commonwealth Games gold medallists for Australia
Commonwealth Games medallists in swimming
Commonwealth Games silver medallists for Australia
Living people
Australian male freestyle swimmers
Medalists at the 2016 Summer Olympics
Olympic gold medalists for Australia
Olympic gold medalists in swimming
Olympic swimmers of Australia
Recipients of the Medal of the Order of Australia
Swimmers from Melbourne
Swimmers at the 2014 Commonwealth Games
Swimmers at the 2016 Summer Olympics
Swimmers at the 2018 Commonwealth Games
Victims of cyberbullying
World Aquatics Championships medalists in swimming
Medalists at the FINA World Swimming Championships (25 m)
Swimmers at the 2020 Summer Olympics
Medalists at the 2020 Summer Olympics
20th-century Australian people
21st-century Australian people
Swimmers at the 2022 Commonwealth Games
Commonwealth Games competitors for Australia
Medallists at the 2014 Commonwealth Games
Medallists at the 2018 Commonwealth Games
Medallists at the 2022 Commonwealth Games